Arthur Edwin Kennelly (December 17, 1861 – June 18, 1939) was an American electrical engineer.

Biography
Kennelly was born December 17, 1861, in Colaba, in Bombay Presidency, British India, and was educated at University College School in London. He was the son of Irish naval officer Captain David Joseph Kennelly (1831–1907) and Catherine Gibson Heycock (1839–1863). His mother died when he was three years old. In 1863, his father retired from the navy and later Arthur and his father returned to England. In 1878, his father married Ellen L.Spencer and moved the family to Sydney, Nova Scotia, when he took over the Sydney and Louisbourg Coal and Railway Company Limited. By his father's third marriage, Arthur gained four half siblings, Zaida Kennelly in 1881, David J. Kennelly Jr. in 1882, Nell K. Kennelly in 1883, and Spencer M. Kennelly in 1885.

Kennelly joined Thomas Edison's West Orange laboratory in December 1887, staying until March 1894. While there he had a role in the war of currents, assisting anti-alternating current crusader Harold P. Brown in developing a demonstration to show how alternating current was more dangerous than direct current as well as a further test to determine the type of electricity that should be used in the electric chair, convincing officials that it should be alternating current.

Kennelly then formed a consulting firm in electrical engineering with Edwin Houston. Together they wrote Alternating Electric Currents (1895), Electrical Engineering leaflets (1896), and Electric arc lighting (1902). In 1893, during his research in electrical engineering, he presented a paper on "Impedance" to the American Institute of Electrical Engineers (AIEE). He researched the use of complex numbers as applied to Ohm's Law in alternating current circuit theory. In 1902, he investigated the ionosphere's radio spectrum's electrical properties, resulting in the concept of the Kennelly–Heaviside layer. Also in 1902 Kennelly was given the entire engineering charge of the expedition which laid Mexican submarine cables on the route Vera Cruz–Frontera–Campeche. He also served as inspector for the Mexican Government during the manufacture of the cable. He was a professor of electrical engineering at Harvard University, 1902–1930, and jointly at the Massachusetts Institute of Technology, 1913–1924. One of his PhD students was Vannevar Bush.

In 1911 and 1912, Kennelly advanced applied mathematics by communicating the theory of the hyperbolic angle and hyperbolic functions, first in a course at the University of London and then in a published book.

He was an active participant in professional organizations such as the Society for the Promotion of the Metric System of Weights and Measures, the Illuminating Engineering Society and the US National Committee of the International Electrotechnical Commission, and also served as the president of both the AIEE and the Institute of Radio Engineers, IRE, during 1898–1900 and 1916, respectively. He was an Invited Speaker of the ICM in 1924 at Toronto.

While Kennelly himself does not appear to have been a significant athlete, he applied his engineering expertise to his avocation: analyzing endurance sports records of horses and humans.  He noticed that time vs. distance plots of such sports records formed nearly a straight line when plotted on log-log graph paper.  Kennelly thus preceded by 75 years Peter Riegel, who also—apparently independently—noticed this same power law, called by Riegel the "endurance equation".  Due to the relatively crude (by today's standards) data available, Kennelly's "Law of Fatigue" utilized the same exponent 9/8 = 1.125 for all of his datasets, whereas Riegel noticed that these exponents differed by sport and by individual.

Kennelly died in Boston, Massachusetts, on June 18, 1939.

Awards and honors
Kennelly received awards from many nations, including the IEE Institution Premium (1887), the Edward Longstreth Medal (1917) and the Howard N. Potts Medal (1918) of the Franklin Institute, the Cross of a Chevalier of the Légion d'honneur of France and the AIEE Edison Medal (1933), now IEEE Edison Medal, "For meritorious achievements in electrical science, electrical engineering and the electrical arts as exemplified by his contributions to the theory of electrical transmission and to the development of international electrical standards."   He was awarded the IRE Medal of Honor (1932), now IEEE Medal of Honor, "For his studies of radio propagation phenomena and his contributions to the theory and measurement methods in the alternating current circuit field which now have extensive radio application."

Works
 See Edwin Houston for the works co-authored with him.

Books
 with Henry David Wilkinson: Practical notes for electrical students (London: "The Electrician" Prtg. & Pub. Co., 1890)
 Wireless telegraphy and wireless telephony an elementary treatise (New York: Moffat, Yard & Co., 1913)
 The application of hyperbolic functions to electrical engineering problems; being the subject of a course of lectures delivered before the University of London in May and June 1911 (London: University of London Press, 1912)
 Artificial Electric Lines: Their Theory, Mode of Construction and Uses (New York: McGraw-Hill, 1917)
 Vestiges of Pre-metric Weights and Measures Persisting in Metric-system Europe 1926-1927 (New York: The Macmillan Company. 1928)
 Electricity in Electro-Therapeutics (The W.J. Johnson Company 1896)

Patents
  — "Electric meter"
  — "Electrostatic voltmeter"

References

External links
 
 Katz, Eugenii, . Biographies of Famous Electrochemists and Physicists Contributed to Understanding of Electricity, Biosensors & Bioelectronics.
 Photo of Arthur E. Kennelly
 A. E. Kennelly and the 1902 Vera Cruz-Frontera-Campeche Cable
National Academy of Sciences Biographical Memoir

1861 births
1939 deaths
American electrical engineers
Harvard University faculty
Irish emigrants to the United States
IEEE Medal of Honor recipients
Edison Pioneers
People educated at University College School
IEEE Edison Medal recipients
Howard N. Potts Medal recipients